Shri Virendra Singh, is a two time Member parliamentarian, from Mirzapur parliamentary constituency. He has been a regular member of Bharatiya Janata Party, the largest mandate party in the currently running parliament. He has been MP during the tenure of (1991-1996) 10th Lok Sabha session and again in 1998, re-elected to the 12th Lok Sabha (2nd term).

During his tenures in the lok sabha, he has been on various committees. In 1991–92,  Committee on Public Undertakings, Committee on Energy, and Consultative Committee, and Ministry of Coal. In 1998–99, Committee on Science and Technology, Environment & Forests (and its Sub-Committees on Ganga Action Plan), Committee on Absence of Members from the Sittings of the House, and Consultative Committee, Ministry of Coal.

He is a social worker and agriculturist by profession.

References 
President of BJP Kisan Morcha - Mr. Virendra Singh

External links
http://www.parliamentofindia.nic.in/ls/lok12/biodata/12UP54.htm
http://mirzapur.nic.in/Political.html#

India MPs 1991–1996
India MPs 1998–1999
Lok Sabha members from Uttar Pradesh
Year of birth missing (living people)
Living people
People from Mirzapur district
Bharatiya Janata Party politicians from Uttar Pradesh